The 7th World Science Fiction Convention (Worldcon), also known as Cinvention, was held on 3–5 September 1949 at the Hotel Metropole in Cincinnati, Ohio, United States.

Don Ford carried out the duties of Chairman, but was officially Secretary-Treasurer; Charles R. Tanner had the honorary title of Chairman.

Participants 

Attendance was approximately 190.

Noteworthy attendees included Forrest J. Ackerman, Hannes Bok, Lester del Rey. Vince Hamlin. Sam Moskowitz, Rog Phillips, Milton Rothman, "Doc" Smith, and George O. Smith.

Guests of Honor 

 Lloyd A. Eshbach (pro)
 Ted Carnell (fan)

See also 

 Hugo Award
 Science fiction
 Speculative fiction
 World Science Fiction Society
 Worldcon

References 

1949 conferences
1949 in Ohio
Science fiction conventions in the United States
Worldcon